Patrick Michael Casey (born March 17, 1959) is an American college baseball coach who was the head coach for the Oregon State Beavers baseball team. He is best known for winning the 2006 College World Series for the Beavers' first-ever baseball National Championship.  The following year, he led the Beavers to a repeat championship in the 2007 College World Series, the first unranked team in history to accomplish this feat. He retired from Oregon State after winning his third championship in the 2018 College World Series.

Playing career
A three-sport athlete at Newberg High School, Casey attended the University of Portland where he played baseball as well as basketball. In baseball, he was named to the All-Pac-10 Conference Northern Division first team in 1979 and 1980, and was drafted in the 10th round by the San Diego Padres in the 1980 Major League Baseball draft. He played seven seasons in the minor leagues, first with the Padres organization from 1980 to 1984, then with the Seattle Mariners organization from 1985 to 1986 and finally the Minnesota Twins triple-A affiliate Portland Beavers in 1987.

Coaching career
After his playing career ended, Casey became head baseball coach at George Fox University, where he earned his undergraduate degree in 1990, also playing basketball for the school while coaching baseball. In seven seasons at George Fox, his baseball team compiled a 171–114–1 record.

In 1995, he was named head coach at Oregon State, where through the 2018 season, he had compiled a 900–458–6 record. Casey focused on recruiting players from the Pacific Northwest. He guided the Beavers to three straight 45+ win seasons, including back-to-back Pac-10 championships, six trips to the College World Series, and three national championships. He is the only coach in NCAA history to lead a team to the National Championship after playing in six elimination games, which he accomplished twice (in 2006 and 2018). After winning the 2006 national championship, the program received its first ever number 1 ranking by all four college baseball polls. He was named the Pac-12 Coach of the year in 2005, 2006, 2011, 2013 and 2017, and was named Baseball America Coach of the Year in 2006 and NCBWA Coach of the Year in 2017. In 2010, Casey was named Baseball America's Coach of the Decade for the years 2000–2009. On September 6, 2018, Casey announced his retirement from Oregon State.

During his career,  Notre Dame  and  Texas  offered him the position of head coach, but Casey decided to stay at Oregon State.

Head coaching record

Personal life
Casey and his wife Susan have three sons and one daughter. Casey is a Roman Catholic and often attends daily Mass.

References

External links

Pat Casey Oral History Interview

1959 births
Living people
Amarillo Gold Sox players
American expatriate baseball players in Canada
American men's basketball players
Baseball coaches from Oregon
Baseball first basemen
Baseball players from Oregon
Beaumont Golden Gators players
Calgary Cannons players
George Fox Bruins baseball coaches
Oregon State Beavers baseball coaches
People from Newberg, Oregon
Portland Beavers players
Portland Pilots baseball players
Portland Pilots men's basketball players
Reno Silver Sox players
Salem Redbirds players
Sportspeople from McMinnville, Oregon
Walla Walla Padres players